Alpha,N-DMT, or α,N-dimethyltryptamine, is a lesser-known psychedelic drug.  It is the α,N-dimethyl analog of DMT. α,N-DMT was first synthesized by Alexander Shulgin. In his book TiHKAL (Tryptamines I Have Known and Loved), Shulgin lists the dosage as 50-100 mg, and the duration as 6–8 hours. α,N-DMT causes an unpleasant body load.  Very little data exists about the pharmacological properties, metabolism, and toxicity of α,N-DMT.

References

External links 
 α,N-DMT Entry in TIHKAL
 α,N-DMT Entry in TiHKAL • info

Psychedelic tryptamines